This article concerns the period 339 BC – 330 BC.

References